Bordeaux Creek is a stream in Dawes County, Nebraska, in the United States.

Bordeaux Creek was named for a French fur trader who settled there.

See also
 Bordeaux Trading Post
 List of rivers of Nebraska

References

Rivers of Dawes County, Nebraska
Rivers of Nebraska